The XII SS Army Corps was a corps of the Waffen-SS. It saw action on both the Western and Eastern Fronts during World War II.

History
The corps was formed on 1 August 1944 in Silesia from the remnants of Kampfgruppe von Gottberg and the LIII Army Corps, and added to the 3rd Panzer Army. From September 1944, it fought in the West as part of the 1st Parachute Army. Later it fought under the 15th Army on the Siegfried Line and the Ruhr Front. The corps was surrounded and destroyed in the Ruhr Pocket in April 1945.

Commanders
 1 August 1944: SS-Obergruppenführer und General der Waffen-SS Matthias Kleinheisterkamp
 6 August 1944: SS-Obergruppenführer und General der Waffen-SS Curt von Gottberg
 18 October 1944: SS-Obergruppenführer und General der Waffen-SS Karl Maria Demelhuber
 20 October 1944: General of the Infantry Günther Blumentritt
 20 January 1945: Generalleutnant Fritz Bayerlein
 29 January 1945: Generalleutnant Eduard Crasemann

Orders of battle
16 September 1944:
 548th Grenadier Division
  7th Panzer-Division

1 March 1945:
 176th Infantry Division
  183rd Volksgrenadier-Division
  338th Infantry Division
  Panzer-Lehr-Division

Sources
 Rolf Stoves: Die gepanzerten und motorisierten deutschen Großverbände 1935–1945. Ed. Dörfler im Nebel-Verlag, Eggolsheim 2003, 

Waffen-SS corps
Military units and formations established in 1944
Military units and formations disestablished in 1945